Throughout the State of Michigan in the United States, many people have found the remains of Pleistocene mammals, almost exclusively mammoths and mastodons. Most of these fossils are found by farmers or construction workers, but most are now in the collection of the University of Michigan. The finding of vertebrate fossils in Michigan is quite rare, so it is best to turn over any specimens to a university or museum for proper cleaning and documentation. Many of these mastodon fossils are found in Southern Michigan, mostly around Ann Arbor. Most mammoth sites are in Northern Michigan.

Pleistocene mammals of Michigan
Jefferson Mammoths, Mammuthus jeffersoni
This species of Mammoth has been found throughout Michigan, and is believed to have eaten mostly grass based on the characteristics of its teeth. These animals were much like the horse, chewing their food from side to side. Specimens of this animal have been found with marks on their bones from what is believed to have been stone tools, which suggests that ancient indigenous people hunted and butchered these huge animals.

American Mastodons, Mammut americanum
The American Mastodon is not only a spectacular fossil found in southern Michigan, but is Michigan's state fossil. It is believed that these animals fed on trees, and lived in herds, much like modern elephants. Along with mammoths, specimens of mastodons with marks from stone tools have been found, which means that they were probably hunted.

Giant Beaver, Castoroides ohioensis
This was by far the largest beaver ever to live, growing up to 7 feet long. Only five sites have ever been recovered, and most of what has been found is parts of the skull and lower jaw.

 Scott's Moose, Cervalces scotti
Only one specimen of this animal has been found in Michigan, an antler that was found in Berrien County.

 Woodland Musk Ox, Symbos cavifrons
There are seven sites in Michigan where this animal has been found, and it is believed that it roamed the plains of North America in large numbers.

References

 A Complete Guide to Michigan Fossil Hunting: Joseph Kchodl
 Fossil Hunting in the Great Lakes State: Jack Stack
 Michael Stack's guide to Michigan fossil hunting

.
.
Paleontology in Michigan
Pleistocene mammals